Driven Crazy is an Australian children's television series, based on the short stories by author Paul Jennings. It first aired in 1998 on Network Ten, and was the second television series based on his works.

Plot

Driven Crazy follows the adventures of the Bourke family, who decide to drive across the continent. There, not only their old Chevy causes trouble.

Cast

Production

All thirteen episodes were based on short stories from Paul Jennings' books Undone! and Uncovered!. After writing the scripts for the first two seasons of Round The Twist, Paul left, after which new writers took over. The debut broadcast of first and only season of Driven Crazy occurred just two years before that of the third season of Round The Twist (in which – along with the subsequent fourth series – Jennings had no input).

Episode List

Season 1 (1998)

References

1998 Australian television series debuts
1998 Australian television series endings
Australian children's television series
Network 10 original programming